Timeline of anthropology, 1880–1889

Events

1884
Pitt Rivers Museum founded
1887
The University of Pennsylvania Museum of Archaeology and Anthropology is founded

Publications
1881
Houses and House-life of the American Aborigines, by Lewis Henry Morgan

1887
Totemism, by James Frazer

Births
1881
Alfred Radcliffe-Brown
Frank Gouldsmith Speck

1884
John Peabody Harrington
Arthur Maurice Hocart
Bronislaw Malinowski
Edward Sapir
1887
Ruth Benedict
Edward Winslow Gifford
1888
Jaime de Angulo

Deaths
1881
John Ferguson McLennan
Lewis Henry Morgan

1887
Johann Bachofen
1888
Edwin Hamilton Davis
Henry Maine
Nikolai Miklukho Malai
Ephraim George Squier

Anthropology by decade
Anthropology
Anthropology timelines
1880s decade overviews